Alternate Kennedys is an alternate history anthology edited by Mike Resnick, published  in the United States by Tor Books. There are 26 stories in the anthology, including Resnick's own "Lady in Waiting". The remaining stories by various authors present scenarios where members of the Kennedy family had lives that were different from real life. The anthology was released on July 1, 1992.

Stories

See also
 List of works by Mike Resnick

References

1992 books
Alternate history anthologies
Tor Books books
Cultural depictions of John F. Kennedy
Cultural depictions of Robert F. Kennedy
Cultural depictions of Martin Luther King Jr.
Cultural depictions of Marilyn Monroe
Cultural depictions of Richard Nixon
Cultural depictions of Elvis Presley